Alfred Kurella (2 May 1895 – 12 June 1975) was a German writer and functionary of the Socialist Unity Party of Germany (SED) in East Germany.

Early years 
Kurella was born in Brieg, Silesia. He was son of the doctor and psychiatrist Hans Kurella. He studied painting and graphics at the Königliche Kunstgewerbeschule München. Kurella volunteered in the army in 1914 but was demobilized a year later. After his return, he worked as a teacher and journalist in left-wing newspapers.

Career 
In 1918, he became a member of the German Communist Party, met Lenin in 1919 and became a member of the Communist Party of the Soviet Union. Kurella began living in Moscow in spring 1934 and began writing for the Deutsche Zentral Zeitung in 1935. In 1937, Kurella became a Soviet citizen and in 1943 was involved in the activity of the antinazi Committee for Free Germany. His brother, Heinrich Kurella, also in exile in the Soviet Union, was arrested by the NKVD during the Great Purge and was executed. In 1954, Kurella returned to East Germany and became a member of the ideological committee of the ruling Socialist Unity Party of Germany (SED).

Death 
His ashes were interred in the Memorial of the Socialists in the Friedrichsfelde Central Cemetery in Berlin-Lichtenberg.

Awards and decorations
 Order of Karl Marx (1961)
 National Prize of the German Democratic Republic (1969)
 Cultural Award of the Free German Trade Union Federation and Free German Youth (1970)
 Honour Clasp to the Patriotic Order of Merit

References 

1895 births
1975 deaths
People from Brzeg
People from the Province of Silesia
Communist Party of Germany politicians
Candidate members of the Politburo of the Central Committee of the Socialist Unity Party of Germany
Members of the 3rd Volkskammer
Members of the 4th Volkskammer
Members of the 5th Volkskammer
Members of the 6th Volkskammer
German male writers
Refugees from Nazi Germany in the Soviet Union
National Committee for a Free Germany members
Recipients of the National Prize of East Germany
Recipients of the Patriotic Order of Merit